Abbas Hasan is a United Kingdom based Canadian-French pop music artist and actor of South Asian heritage who has been named "the next big thing" in the Asian music and film scene by MTV India and HELLO! Magazine, and has recently won the Artist of the Year 2014 Award at Anokhi Media Awards in Canada.
 He was named one of the UK's Top 5 Most Stylish Asian Men by the New Asian Post. He is also the brand ambassador for the New York-based luxury watch and lifestyle company Nooka. Abbas's music reflects his varied background with desi and middle-eastern influences, and he sings in English, Urdu, Hindi and French.

Biography
From singing for the Mickey Mouse club to being photographed at Elton John's parties, the French pop sensation Abbas Hasan has already had quite a journey into the music world. Abbas Hasan is of Pakistani heritage. Born in Canada, Abbas moved to Paris, France at the age of one, where he forayed into the world of arts and music at a young age. His childhood music experiences included advertisements and other public broadcasts, and took on a new direction through singing and performing for Disney in Paris. Over time, he continued his involvement in the world of drama, music and modelling across his moves from France to Canada and Great Britain. He is now signed with Rishi Rich Productions, famed for launching other acts including Jay Sean and Juggy D.

Commonly referred to in music press as the next Jay Sean, Abbas performs in French, Urdu, English and Hindi. In an online interview, Abbas said that because of his Pakistani background, he is fluent in Urdu language and that is why he easily sings desi songs.

Abbas is an ambassador for the New York-based luxury watch and lifestyle company Nooka. He was named Bachelor of the Year for 2010 by Asian Woman Magazine, included in Asiana Magazine's Most Eligible Bachelors List for 2010, and has been included in a list of Top 10 Most Handsome South Asian Male Models in the UK, compiled by an event management company named KZ Entertainment.

Music career
Nominated for the "Artist of the Year" award by Anokhi in Canada for 2014, Abbas's music experience began with singing and performing for Disney as a child in Paris. Abbas launched his career with his debut single with Rishi Rich named "Sona" which was released on iTunes, Amazon, E-music and Napster and successfully topped the British Asian music charts shortly after its release. His next single "Habibi" did equally well topping the British Asian charts once again. After touring the UK with the BBC Asian Network's Melas, Abbas went to India to star in his first film.
After performing at the London premiere of Priyanka Chopra and Shahid Kapoor's Bollywood film Teri Meri Kahaani, Abbas burst onto the international stage as the only new talent to perform at the first ever The Times of India Film Awards (TOIFA) held in Vancouver, British Columbia, Canada. Since then, went on a European tour with Indian Bollywood songstress Shreya Ghoshal and Abbas released an international hit with Rishi Rich entitled "Away" starring BAFTA award-winning actress Humaima Malick. Abbas's "Away" single featuring Rishi Rich received rave reviews from the press and the video has been termed "iconic"; rumours suggest his next video will star "Slumdog Millionaire" actress and L'Oreal ambassador Freida Pinto or Mahira Khan

Most recently Abbas has been in the news for having an upcoming release with Bollywood superstar Shahrukh Khan.

Film and Acting career
Abbas is playing the lead role in a Malayalam–language Indian film titled Mazhavillinattam Vare. He is playing the role of a Pakistani cricketer named Yassin Mubarak Azad. He was cast in the film after Pakistani cricketer Mohammed Asif and later Mohammad Hafeez were replaced from the role. The film drew controversy when Mohommad Asif was dropped from the film due to match fixing allegations. Abbas made a cameo appearance in a television advert with one of the biggest stars in Bollywood, Shahrukh Khan. Following his performance at the Times of India Film Awards, rumours are circulating about Abbas acting in more films in the future.

References

External links
 Abbas Hasan Official Website
 Abbas Hasan on YouTube

Year of birth missing (living people)
Living people
Canadian emigrants to France
Canadian people of Pakistani descent
French pop singers
French people of Pakistani descent
Musicians from Paris
Musicians from Ottawa